Spain competed at the 1956 Winter Olympics in Cortina d'Ampezzo, Italy.

Alpine skiing

Men

Bobsleigh

Figure skating

Men

References
Official Olympic Reports
 Olympic Winter Games 1956, full results by sports-reference.com

Nations at the 1956 Winter Olympics
1956
Oly